Granite Mountains may refer to one of at least six mountain ranges in the United States:

Granite Mountains (Alaska)
Granite Mountains (Arizona)
Granite Mountains (California) in San Bernardino County
Granite Mountains (Riverside County, California)
Granite Mountains (Mono County, California)
Granite Mountains (Wyoming)

See also
Granite Mountain (disambiguation)